Javier Ignacio Aquino Carmona (born 11 February 1990) is a Mexican professional footballer who plays as a full-back for Liga MX club Tigres UANL. He is an Olympic gold medalist.

Aquino made his debut with Cruz Azul in 2010, playing in over 70 league matches until his transfer to Spanish Liga Adelante club Villarreal in January 2013, with whom he gained promotion to La Liga that same season. In 2014, he was loaned out to Rayo Vallecano. After a quiet performance with Rayo Vallecano, in 2015 he returned to Mexico to join Tigres UANL.

Aquino has been called up to the Mexico U-23 national team, where he was a part of the squads playing at the 2011 Copa América, the 2011 Pan American Games, and the 2012 Summer Olympics, where Mexico won the gold medal. He made his debut with the senior national team in 2011, and participated in the 2013 and 2017 FIFA Confederations Cup, as well as the 2014 and 2018 FIFA World Cup.

Club career

Cruz Azul
Born in San Francisco Ixhuatán in the Mexican state of Oaxaca, Aquino began playing in Cruz Azul's lower division youth squads. Aquino played for Cruz Azul Lagunas of the third division, where he then traveled to Mexico City to join the club's reserves. It would not be until the Apertura 2010 season that Aquino, together with other youth players, joined the first team. Aquino was one of the revelations of the tournament, his main virtues being dribbling, speed and passing accuracy.

On 23 July 2010 during the Apertura 2010, Aquino debuted for Cruz Azul under coach Enrique Meza in a 0–3 win over Estudiantes Tecos, coming in as a 57th-minute substitute for Alejandro Vela. He scored his first goal in the Primera División on 24 October 2010 during match-day 13 of the Apertura 2010 against Morelia in a 1–1 draw at Estadio Morelos. He gradually cemented his place into the team's starting eleven as the main right-winger, going on to play for two more years at Cruz Azul, amassing over 90 appearances for the club, scoring seven goals.

Villarreal
On 28 January 2013 it was announced that Aquino was transferred to Villarreal CF of Spain. He made his league debut coming on as a 67th-minute substitute for Moi Gómez in a 1–1 draw against Hércules CF.

On 19 August 2013, Javier Aquino made his debut in La Liga, entering as a substitute in the second half of the match against Almería. He collaborated towards the final 3–2 victory for Villarreal, with an assist to fellow Mexican teammate Giovani dos Santos.

Rayo Vallecano (loan)
On 25 August 2014, Villarreal announced that Aquino would be loaned out for the 2014–15 season to Rayo Vallecano.
He made his league debut against Atlético Madrid on 25 August, and played all 90 minutes of the match which ended in a 0–0 draw.

Tigres UANL
After a discreet performance with Rayo Vallecano in the Spanish 2014–15 season, in June 2015, it was announced that he would join Mexican team Tigres UANL. With Tigres, he played the 2015 Copa Libertadores finals against River Plate. Tigres lost by 3–0 in Argentina after a 0–0 draw in Mexico. In December 2015, Tigres won the Mexico Apertura 2015 finals against Pumas UNAM, in December 2016 the Apertura 2016 finals against América and in December 2017 the Apertura 2017 finals against Monterrey; Aquino played a key role for the team in the championships.

International career

Youth
Aquino was called up by Luis Fernando Tena to play in the 2011 Pan American Games, in which he played in all six games and won the Gold Medal match against Argentina. He scored his first unofficial international goal in a friendly against Club León on 5 July 2012 in a 1–1 draw.

Aquino took a hiatus from the senior squad to train with the under-23 team in preparations for the 2012 Summer Olympics, in which they won a gold medal in the final against Brazil.

Senior
Aquino made his official debut with the senior national team on 4 July 2011 against Chile in the 2011 Copa América. He played in all three group matches.

The national team that played the 2011 Copa América was an under-22 squad composed of 5 "over-age" players. FIFA has classified the team as the official "senior squad" but it could be said that his debut with the senior squad was on 11 November 2011 against Serbia in a 2–0 friendly, he coming into play at the 86th minute for Andrés Guardado.
He made his next appearance on 25 January 2012 in another friendly against Venezuela where he was attributed as adding creativity to Mexico's offense. He entered the game on the 56th minute while the game was tied 1–1, and was involved in the last two goals that Mexico scored to win the match 3–1.

Aquino was initially omitted from the final 23 man roster that would participate in the 2014 FIFA World Cup, however after Luis Montes suffered a severe leg injury, Aquino would be called up to round out the 23 player at the 2014 World Cup.

Aquino's most brilliant moment came at the 2017 FIFA Confederations Cup against New Zealand. Aquino would go on to be named man of the match.

In May 2018, Aquino was named in Mexico's preliminary 28-man squad for the World Cup, and in June, was ultimately included in the final 23-man roster.

On 29 May 2019, Aquino announced his retirement from the internacional scene commenting that he talked with the new head coach Gerardo Martino and asked him to not be called anymore for the Mexican national team's matches, despite "El Tata" having considered Aquino for the 2019 CONCACAF Gold Cup.

Career statistics

Honours
Tigres UANL
Liga MX: Apertura 2015, Apertura 2016, Apertura 2017, Clausura 2019
Campeón de Campeones: 2016, 2017, 2018
CONCACAF Champions League: 2020

Mexico U23
Pan American Games: 2011
CONCACAF Olympic Qualifying Championship: 2012
Olympic Gold Medal: 2012

Mexico
CONCACAF Cup: 2015

Individual
Liga MX Best XI: Apertura 2015

References

External links

 
  
  (archive)
 
 
 

1990 births
Living people
Mexico international footballers
Association football wingers
2011 Copa América players
Footballers at the 2011 Pan American Games
Footballers at the 2012 Summer Olympics
2013 FIFA Confederations Cup players
2014 FIFA World Cup players
2015 Copa América players
Copa América Centenario players
2017 FIFA Confederations Cup players
Liga MX players
Ascenso MX players
Liga Premier de México players
Tercera División de México players
Segunda División players
La Liga players
Cruz Azul footballers
Cruz Azul Hidalgo footballers
Villarreal CF players
Rayo Vallecano players
Tigres UANL footballers
People from Oaxaca City
Footballers from Oaxaca
Olympic footballers of Mexico
Olympic gold medalists for Mexico
Olympic medalists in football
Medalists at the 2012 Summer Olympics
Mexican expatriate footballers
Expatriate footballers in Spain
Mexican expatriate sportspeople in Spain
Pan American Games gold medalists for Mexico
Pan American Games medalists in football
2018 FIFA World Cup players
Medalists at the 2011 Pan American Games
Mexican footballers